The Multi-Role Tanker Transport (MRTT) is a military aerial refueling and transport airplane constructed by Airbus manufactured in two versions, both conversions of existing civilian passenger aircraft:

 Airbus A310 MRTT, based on the Airbus A310 airliner
 Airbus A330 MRTT, based on the Airbus A330 airliner